The Cauliflower Alley Club is a non-profit fraternal organization, which includes a newsletter and website, comprising both retired and active professional wrestlers and boxers in North America.

Established in 1965 by Mike Mazurki and Art Abrams, the organization hosts an annual reunion dinner which has traditionally been attended by celebrities and other professional athletes.

History 
The Cauliflower Alley Club was founded in 1965 by Mike Mazurki as a fraternal organization of professional wrestlers, boxers, and actors. The first annual reunion dinner was held at the Baron's Castle Buffet Restaurant in Los Angeles, California. The Club also presents numerous awards annually at the reunion dinner.

Several prominent former professional wrestlers have been president of the club, including Red Bastien, Nick Bockwinkel, and the current president, Brian Blair.
The Club has a "benevolent fund which helps people from the wrestling business in a time of need." Proceeds are raised for the fund during the annual reunion weekend.

Awards

2020s

2010s

2000s

1990s

1999
Iron Mike Mazurki Award: Jesse "The Body" Ventura
Art Abrams Lifetime Achievement Award: Dan Gable

Other honorees included Ken Patera, Jack Donovan and Bob Geigel.

1998
Iron Mike Mazurki Award: Lou Thesz
Art Abrams Lifetime Achievement Award: William Papas
Scholarship Award Winners: Billy Pappas

Other honorees included Danny Hodge, Fred Blassie, Dory Funk, Jr. and Dan Severn

1997
Iron Mike Mazurki Award: Tom Drake
Art Abrams Lifetime Achievement Award: Penny Banner
Reel Member Inductees: Elliott Gould, Tommy Sands and Terry Moore
Boxing Honorees: Don Fraser, Lou Filippo and Robert Salazar

Other honorees included:

Elizabeth, New Jersey (October 11): Sika Anoa'i, Ted Lewin, Donn Lewin, The Fabulous Moolah, Jimmy Valiant, Jim Cornette, Diamond Lil, The Destroyer, The Dudley Boyz, Devon Storm and Georgiann Makropoulos.
Studio City, California (March 15): Tony Borne, Don Curtis, Tom Drake, Don Manoukian, Steve Rickard and Jim White.

1996
Iron Mike Mazurki Award: Dick Beyer
Scholarship Award Winners: Gordy Morgan and Marty Morgan
Reel Member Inductees: Lawrence Tierney, Fred Williamson, Denver Pyle, Beverly Garland, Norm Crosby and John T. Smith
Boxing Honorees: Chuck Wepner

Other honorees included:

Tampa, Florida (October 26): Angelo Poffo, Bonnie Watson, Judy Glover, Jack & Jerry Brisco, Carl Engstrom, Wahoo McDaniel, Gordon Solie and Molly McShane.
Elizabeth, New Jersey (October 5): Vince McMahon, Vince McMahon, Sr., Jimmy Snuka and Tammy Lynn Sytch.
Studio City, California (March 16): Stan Hansen, Nelson Royal, Art Michalik, Stan Stasiak, Larry Zbyszko, Angelo Mosca, Seiji Sakaguchi, Masami Yoshida, Chigusa Nagayo, Bobby Heenan, Baron von Raschke and Antonio Inoki.

1995
Iron Mike Mazurki Award: Gene LeBell
Reel Member Inductees: Binnie Barnes, Marie Windsor, Jan Merlin and John Saxton
Martial Arts Honorees: Benny Urquidez and Mimi Lessos
Boxing Honorees: Gabriel Ruelas and Rafael Ruelas

Other honorees included:

Elizabeth, New Jersey (September 30): Angelo Savoldi, Capt. Lou Albano, Abe Coleman, Gloria Barratini, Millie Stafford, Pat Patterson, Johnny Rodz and The Public Enemy.
Studio City, California (March 8): Tiger Conway, Sr., Leo Garibaldi, Susan Sexton, Dave Levin, Ray Stevens, The Sheik and Buddy Lee.

1994
Iron Mike Mazurki Award: Vic Christy
Reel Member Inductees: Harry Carey, Jr.
Boxing Honorees: Lou Bogash, Joe Graziano, Lou Couture, Jocko V. Ananian, Micky Finn, Tom McNeely, Harol Gomes, Willie Pep, Carmen Basilio and Vincent Pazienza

Other honorees included:

Springfield, Massachusetts (October 1): Gorilla Monsoon, Pedro Morales, Brittany Brown, Candi Devine, Arnold Skaaland, Jackie Nichols, Karl Von Hess, Ilio DiPaolo and Kitty Adams.
Studio City, California (March 19): Dick Hutton, Billy Robinson, Stuart McCullum, Al Costello, Peggy Allen, Sherri Martel, Ed Francis and Sue Green.

1993
Iron Mike Mazurki Award: Hard Boiled Haggerty
Scholarship Award Winners: Nick Cline and Mike Bresnan
Reel Member Inductees: John Agar, Guy Madison, John Phillip Law and Will Hutchins.
Boxing Honorees: Genaro (Chicanito) Hernandez, Zacky Padilla, Oscar De La Hoya, Mike Witowich, Chuck Bodak, Jerry Moore, Petey Servin and Jerry Quarry

Other honorees included Verne Gagne, “Cowboy” Bob Ellis, Kinji Shibuya, Wendi Richter, Barbi Dahl and Peggy Patterson.

1992
Iron Mike Mazurki Award: Woody Strode
Reel Member Inductees: Woody Strode
Boxing Honorees: Clarence Henry, Fabela Chavez,Jimmy Roybal, Jimmy Casino and Dave Maier

Other honorees included Maurice Vachon, Hard Boiled Haggerty, Rey Urbano, Johnny James, Gene Kiniski, Pepper Gomez, Penny Banner, Debbie Combs, Belle Starr, Donna Christantello and Diamond Lil.

Presidents

See also
 List of professional wrestling awards
List of professional wrestling conventions

References

Further reading
 "Cauliflower Alley Club Lends an Ear to Boxers, Wrestlers". Los Angeles Times.
 "Cauliflower Alley Club: 'Gentle and Warm People'". The Argus-Press.
 Historical Dictionary of Wrestling. p. 65.
 Blassie, Fred and Keith Elliot Greenberg. "Classy" Freddie Blassie: Listen, You Pencil Neck Geeks. New York: Simon and Schuster, 2003. 
 Funk, Terry and Scott E. Williams. Terry Funk: The Hardcore Legend. Champaign, Illinois: Sports Publishing LLC, 2005. 
 LeBelle, Gene. Gene Lebell's Grappling World: The Encyclopedia of Finishing Holds. Champaign, Illinois: Sports Publishing LLC, 2005. 
 Loeffler, Carl E. and Darlene Tong. Performance Anthology: Source Book of California Performance Art. San Francisco: Last Gasp Press, 1989. 
 Meltzer, Dave. Tributes II: Remembering the World's Greatest Wrestlers. Champaign, Illinois: Sports Publishing LLC, 2004.

External links
 Cauliflower Alley Club official website
 Cauliflower Alley Club official radio show
 SLAM! Wrestling: Cauliflower Alley Club stories
 House of Deception, Cauliflower Alley Club history and photos

Professional wrestling websites
Non-profit organizations based in Missouri
1965 establishments in Missouri
501(c)(3) organizations
Professional wrestling awards
Professional wrestling in Canada
Professional wrestling in the United States